In music theory, a trichord is a group of three different pitch classes found within a larger group. A trichord is a contiguous three-note set from a musical scale or a twelve-tone row.

In musical set theory there are twelve trichords given inversional equivalency, and, without inversional equivalency, nineteen trichords. These are numbered 1–12, with symmetrical trichords being unlettered and with uninverted and inverted nonsymmetrical trichords lettered A or B, respectively. They are often listed in prime form, but may exist in different voicings; different inversions at different transpositions. For example, the major chord, 3-11B (prime form: [0,4,7]), is an inversion of the minor chord, 3-11A (prime form: [0,3,7]). 3-5A and B are the Viennese trichord (prime forms: [0,1,6] and [0,5,6]).

Historical Russian definition

In late-19th to early 20th-century Russian musicology, the term trichord (трихорд) meant something more specific: a set of three pitches, each at least a tone apart but all within the range of a fourth or fifth.
The possible trichords on C would then be:

Several of these pitch sets interlocking could form a larger set such as a pentatonic scale (such as C–D–F–G–B–C'). It was first coined by theorist  in his 1888 book Русская народная музыка ("Russian Folk Music") to explain the observed traits of the rural Russian folk music (especially from southern regions) that was just beginning to be recorded and published at this time. The term gained wide acceptance and usage, but as time went on it became less relevant to contemporary ethnomusicological findings; ethnomusicologist Kliment Kvitka opined in his 1928 article on Sokalsky's theories that it should also properly be used for pitch sets of three notes in the interval of a third, which had been found to be just as characteristic of Russian folk traditions (but which was unknown in Sokalsky's time). By mid-century, a group of Moscow-based ethnomusicologists (K. V. Kvitka, Ye. V. Gippius, A. V. Rudnyova, N. M. Bachinskaya, L. S. Mukharinskaya, among others) boycotted the use of the term altogether, yet it could still be seen in the mid-20th century due to its heavy use in the works of earlier theorists.

Etymology

The term is derived by analogy from the 20th-century use of the word "tetrachord". Unlike the tetrachord and hexachord, there is no traditional standard scale arrangement of three notes, nor is the trichord necessarily thought of as a harmonic entity.

Milton Babbitt's serial theory of combinatoriality makes much of the properties of three-note, four-note, and six-note segments of a twelve-tone row, which he calls, respectively, trichords, tetrachords, and hexachords, extending the traditional sense of the terms and retaining their implication of contiguity. He usually reserves the term "source set" for their unordered counterparts (especially hexachords), but does occasionally employ terms such as "source tetrachords" and "combinatorial trichords, tetrachords, and hexachords" instead.

Allen Forte occasionally makes informal use of the term trichord to mean what he usually calls "sets of three elements", and other theorists (notably including Howard, and Carlton) mean by the term triad a three-note pitch collection which is not necessarily a contiguous segment of a scale or a tone row and not necessarily (in twentieth-century music) tertian or diatonic either.

Number of unique trichords

Typically, there are 12 tones in the western scale. Computing the number of unique trichords is a mathematical problem. A computer program can quickly iterate all the triads and remove the ones that are merely transpositions of others, leaving (as noted above) nineteen or, to within inversional equivalence, twelve. As an example, the following list contains all trichords that can be made including the note C, but includes 36 that are merely transpositions or transposed inversions of others:

 C D♭ D [0,1,2] – this combination has no name (half step cluster, with doubly diminished third and quintuply diminished fifth, spelled enharmonically)
 C D♭ E♭ [0,1,3] – this combination has no name
 C D♭ E [0,1,4] – Eaug with sus6
 C D♭ F [0,1,5] – Dmaj seventh (omit 5th)
 C D♭ G♭ [0,1,6] – Gsus#4
 C D♭ G [0,5,6] (= inv. of [0,1,6])
 C D♭ A♭ [0,4,5] (= inv. of [0,1,5])
 C D♭ A [0,3,4] (= inv. of [0,1,4]) – Daug with sus7
 C D♭ B♭ [0,2,3] (= inv. of [0,1,3])
 C D♭ B [0,1,2] – this combination has no name (half step cluster, with doubly diminished third and quintuply diminished fifth, spelled enharmonically)
 C D E♭ [0,2,3] (= inv. of [0.1.3]) – this combination has no name
 C D E [0,2,4] – Eaug with sus#6
 C D F [0,2,5] – Fsus6
 C D G♭ [0,2,6] – Ddom seventh (enharmonic spelling, omit 5th)
 C D G [0,2,7] – Csus2
 C D A♭ [0,4,6] (= inv. of [0,2,6]) – Ddim sus7
 C D A [0,3,5] (= inv. of [0,2,5]) – Dsus7
 C D B♭ [0,2,4] – Daug with sus#6
 C D B [0,1,3]
 C E♭ E [0,3,4] (= inv. of [0,1,4]) – Eaug with sus7
 C E♭ F [0,3,5] (= inv. of [0,2,5]) – Fsus#6
 C E♭ G♭ [0,3,6] – Cdim
 C E♭ G [0,3,7] – Cminor
 C E♭ A♭ [0,4,7] (= inv. of [0,3,7]) – Amajor
 C E♭ A [0,3,6] – Adim
 C E♭ B♭ [0,2,5]
 C E♭ B [0,1,4]
 C E F [0,4,5] (= inv. of [0,2,5]) – Fsus7
 C E G♭ [0,4,6] (= inv. of [0,2,6]) – Eaug with sus2
 C E G [0,4,7] (= inv. of 0,3,7]) – Cmajor
 C E A♭ [0,4,8] – C/E/Aaug
 C E A [0,3,7] – Aminor
 C E B♭ [0,2,6] – Cdom seventh (omit 5th)
 C E B [0,1,5] – Cmaj seventh (omit 5th)
 C F G♭ [0,5,6] (= inv. of [0,1,6]) – Fsus#1
 C F G [0,2,7]
 C F A♭ [0,3,7] – Fminor
 C F A [0,4,7] – Fmajor
 C F B♭ [0,2,7]
 C F B [0,1,6]
 C G♭ G [0,1,6]
 C G♭ A♭ [0,2,6] – Adom seventh (omit 5th)
 C G♭ A [0,3,6] – F dim
 C G♭ B♭ [0,4,6] (= inv. of [0,2,6])
 C G♭ B [0,5,6] (= inv. of [0,1,6])
 C G A♭ [0,1,5] – Amaj seventh (omit 5th)
 C G A [0,2,5]
 C G B♭ [0,3,5]
 C G B [0,4,5] (= inv. of [0,1,5])
 C A♭ A [0,1,4]
 C A♭ B♭ [0,2,4] – Caug with sus#6
 C A♭ B [0,1,4]
 C A B♭ [0,1,2]
 C A B [0,2,3] – this combination has no name
 C B♭ B [0,1,2] – this combination has no name (half step cluster, with doubly diminished third and quintuply diminished fifth, spelled enharmonically)

While some of these chords are recognizable and ubiquitous, many others are unusual or rarely used. Although this list enumerates only trichords containing the note C, the number of all possible trichords inside a single octave is 220 (the binomial coefficient of picking three keys out of twelve).

See also

 Triad
 All-trichord hexachord

References

Sources
 
 
 
   (cloth)  (pbk).

Further reading
 Gilbert, Steven E. (1970). "The Trichord: An Analytic Outlook for Twentieth-Century Music". Ph.D. diss. New Haven: Yale University.

Simultaneities (music)
Chords